Marco Aurélio Ubiali (Franca, born November 7, 1949) is a doctor, teacher and Brazilian congressman.

References

External links
 Dr. Ubiali - Official website
 Dr. Ubiali - Facebook FanPage

Members of the Chamber of Deputies (Brazil) from São Paulo
1949 births
Living people
People from Franca